State Road 261 in the U.S. state of Indiana is a route in southwest Warrick County.

Route description
State Road 261 connects begins at State Road 66 north of Newburgh, a suburb of Evansville.  It runs to the northeast past Rolling Hills Country Club and Quail Crossing Golf Club.  It terminates at State Road 62 on the west side of Boonville.

History
SR 261 used to continue south along Old SR 261 and State Street to end at 662

Major intersections

References

External links

261
Transportation in Warrick County, Indiana